Paul L. Krinsky (born November 9, 1928) was an American merchant mariner and sailor. He served as the superintendent of the United States Merchant Marine Academy from 1987 to 1993 and attained the rank of rear admiral.

Early life and career
Krinsky was born to Hilda and Nat Krinsky on November 9, 1928.

Krinsky entered the United States Merchant Marine Academy in 1946. He graduated with honors in 1950 and became an ensign. He sailed in the United States Merchant Marines as a deck officer for United States Lines aboard the passenger ships SS America and SS United States. In 1955, Krinsky went on active duty with the United States Navy, serving as navigator aboard the USS Everglades (AD-24). Leaving active duty in 1958, he remained in the United States Naval Reserve and retired as a captain. Krinsky also served as a naval science instructor at the New York State Maritime College.

Merchant Marine Academy
In 1958, Krinsky joined the faculty of the Merchant Marine Academy, teaching a wide range of navigation and seamanship courses in the Department of Nautical Sciences. Over the years, Krinsky held many important posts at the academy, including Director of Admissions, Academic Dean, and Deputy Superintendent. In 1987, Krinsky was appointed superintendent of the Merchant Marine Academy and was made a rear admiral.

He was married to Audrey Krinsky and had two children, Ross and David.

Awards and decorations
Superior Accomplishment Award (United States Maritime Administration) - NS Savannah Nuclear Project
Silver Medal Award for Meritorious Service (United States Department of Commerce)
Naval Reserve Medal
Armed Forces Reserve Medal
Navy Occupation Service Medal
National Defense Service Medal

References
Original text from  Library of Congress
Original text from  Library of Congress
 United States Merchant Marine Academy Official Website USMMA Parents Page

United States Merchant Marine Academy superintendents
United States Merchant Marine Academy alumni
1928 births
Living people
Place of birth missing (living people)